Terence Anthony Gordon Davis  (born 5 January 1938) is a British Labour Party politician and businessman. He was the Member of Parliament (MP) for Bromsgrove from 1971 to 1974, and for Birmingham Stechford and its successor seat, Birmingham Hodge Hill, from 1979 to 2004. He was then Secretary General of the Council of Europe from 2004 to 2009.

Early life
He went to the King Edward VI Grammar School (now the King Edward VI College) in Stourbridge.
Davis is a graduate of University College London, where he gained an LLB degree in 1962, and University of Michigan's Ross School of Business, where he gained an MBA degree in 1962. He was a company executive from 1962 to 1971 for Esso, Clarks shoes and Chrysler Parts. From 1974 to 1979, he was a manager in the motor industry, with Leyland Cars.

Parliamentary career
At the 1970 general election, Davis stood unsuccessfully in the Conservative-held Bromsgrove constituency.  The sitting MP, James Dance, died the following year, and Davis won the resulting by-election.

The Bromsgrove constituency was abolished in boundary changes for the February 1974 general election, and in the new Bromsgrove and Redditch constituency, Davis lost to the Conservative Hal Miller. He stood again at the October 1974 general election and lost again. At the 1979 election, his wife Anne contested the seat for Labour and lost by a much larger margin.

In 1977, Birmingham Stechford Labour MP, Roy Jenkins, was appointed President of the European Commission, and Davis was selected as the Labour candidate in the by-election.  He lost by 1,949 votes to the Conservative Andrew MacKay, but at the 1979 general election, he won the seat with a majority of 1,649.

The Stechford constituency was abolished in boundary changes for the 1983 general election, and Davis was re-elected in the successor constituency of Birmingham Hodge Hill.  He held that seat until his retirement from the House of Commons 21 years later.

In 2004 he was elected Secretary General of the Council of Europe, and announced his intention to stand down from the UK parliament by applying for the Stewardship of the Chiltern Hundreds.  The resulting by-election was held on 15 July and won by Labour's Liam Byrne. He left the Council of Europe on 31 August 2009. He was appointed Companion of the Order of St Michael and St George (CMG) in the 2010 New Year Honours.

Wikileaks "cablegate" revelations disclosed that the US, unhappy about his criticisms of the US's rendition program, regarded him as an "unpopular lame duck".

Personal life
He married Anne Cooper in 1963. They have a son and daughter.

References

External links
 Council of Europe: curriculum vitæ for Terry Davis
 
 The Council of Europe and International Norms in Comparative Perspective Podcast of speech by Terry Davis for the Foundation for Law, Justice and Society, Oxford

1938 births
20th-century English businesspeople
Alumni of University College London
Automotive businesspeople
British business executives
Companions of the Order of St Michael and St George
Council of Europe Secretaries-General
Labour Party (UK) MPs for English constituencies
Living people
Members of the Privy Council of the United Kingdom
People educated at King Edward VI College, Stourbridge
People from Stourbridge
Ross School of Business alumni
UK MPs 1970–1974
UK MPs 1979–1983
UK MPs 1983–1987
UK MPs 1987–1992
UK MPs 1992–1997
UK MPs 1997–2001
UK MPs 2001–2005